The Tai'an Hot Spring is a hot spring in Tai'an Township, Miaoli County, Taiwan.

History
The hot spring was originally named the Ueshima Hot Spring during the Japanese rule of Taiwan. After the handover of Taiwan from Japan to the Republic of China in 1945, it was renamed to Hu Mountain Hot Spring. In 1978, President Chiang Ching-kuo visited the hot spring and renamed it as Tai'an Hot Spring.

Features
The hot spring water is colorless and odorless. It has a temperature of 47°C.

Transportation
The hot spring is accessible by bus and taxi from Miaoli Station of the Taiwan Railways.

See also
 List of tourist attractions in Taiwan
 Taiwanese hot springs

References

Hot springs of Taiwan
Tourist attractions in Miaoli County